European Parliament elections were held in the British Overseas Territory of Gibraltar (which formed part of the European Parliament constituency combined region of South West England) on 22 May 2014, with the results announced on 25 May 2014. On the previous two occasions Gibraltar has participated in European elections, the Conservative Party had topped the poll. The Liberal Democrats won the popular vote in the territory for the first time. They opposed British withdrawal from the European Union and were the only party to include a Gibraltar resident on their list of candidates, Lyana Armstrong-Emery of the Liberal Party of Gibraltar.

The result was notable as one of only four counting areas in which the Liberal Democrats topped the poll, the others being South Lakeland in Cumbria and Orkney and Shetland in Scotland. 
Despite the result in Gibraltar, the Liberal Democrat vote fell across the South West region (and the whole of the UK), and the sitting Liberal Democrat MEP, Graham Watson, described as a "stalwart" and "advocate" of Gibraltar, lost his seat.

Results

See also
2014 European Parliament election in the United Kingdom

References

Gibraltar
European Parliament elections in Gibraltar
European
May 2014 events in Europe